Claudiopolis is the name of a number of ancient cities named after Roman emperor Claudius or another person bearing that name (in the case of Cluj-Napoca), notably:

 in Turkey
 Claudiopolis (Bithynia) or Bithynium
 Claudiopolis (Cilicia)
 Claudiopolis (Cappadocia)
 Claudiopolis (Cataonia)
 Claudiopolis (Galatia)

 Elsewhere
 Abila Lysaniou, an ancient city in Syria also called Claudiopolis
 Cluj-Napoca, a city in Romania
 The ancient town of Cyrene, Libya, renamed after 262 AD, in honor of the 3rd-century Roman emperor Claudius II